is a Japanese footballer currently playing as a forward for FC Osaka.

Career 
Shimada begin first youth career with Nara Ikuei High School in 2012 until he graduated from school in 2014. When, he entered to college in Osaka University of Economics in 2015 until he was graduation in 2018.

After graduation from university. On 22 December 2018, Shimada begin first professional career with Hometown club, Nara Club from 2019. In the 2020 season, he played in all 15 league games and scored 5 goals. He was the team's top scorer, ranking seventh in scoring.

On 18 December 2020, Shimada joined to J3 club, Vanraure Hachinohe from 2021 season. On 30 December 2022, he terminated his contract with his club and left for the Vanraure Hachinohe after two years in Hachinohe.

On 11 January 2023, Shimada announcement officially transfer to J3 newly promoted club, FC Osaka for upcoming 2023 season.

Career statistics

Club
.

Notes

References

External links 

1996 births
Living people
Osaka University of Economics alumni
Japanese footballers
Association football forwards
Japan Football League players
J3 League players
Nara Club players
Vanraure Hachinohe players
FC Osaka players